The Bayer designation ρ Eridani (Rho Eridani, ρ Eri) is shared by three stars in the constellation Eridanus that lie in a line:
ρ1 Eridani (8 Eridani)
ρ2 Eridani (9 Eridani)
ρ3 Eridani (10 Eridani)

Eridani, Rho
Eridanus (constellation)